The 1901 Nebraska Cornhuskers football team represented the University of Nebraska as an independent during the 1901 college football season. Led by second-year head coach Walter C. Booth, the Cornhuskers compiled a record of 6–2, excluding one exhibition game. Nebraska played home games at Antelope Field in Lincoln, Nebraska.

With victories over Iowa State, Missouri, Kansas, and Haskell, Nebraska was recognized as Missouri Valley champion.

Schedule

Coaching staff

Roster

Game summaries

Lincoln High

at Kirksville Osteopaths

Nebraska managed only one touchdown against the medical students from Kirksville, holding on to win 5–0. This was the only meeting between Kirksville and Nebraska.

Doane

After a four-year break, Doane and Nebraska resumed their series in Lincoln. Nebraska dominated the game, its third straight shutout victory.

at Minnesota

For the second consecutive year, Minnesota ended Nebraska's unbeaten season, this time in a dominating 19–0 victory.

Iowa State

Nebraska, shorthanded due to injuries suffered against Minnesota, shut out Iowa State for the second straight year, allowing only 75 yards and three first downs to the Cyclones.

Wisconsin

Nebraska and Wisconsin met for the first time in Milwaukee, an 18–0 Badgers victory. Over 100 years later, the teams would become division rivals when Nebraska joined the Big Ten in 2011.

Missouri

Nebraska hammered Missouri 51–0 in Omaha, the second-largest victory in program history.

Kansas

An early Nebraska fumble put Kansas on the scoreboard, but Nebraska dominated the rest of the game to even the all-time series at five.

Haskell

Haskell and Nebraska met for the first time to close the 1901 season. Haskell, despite using a team of high school players (the school would not add a college until the following year), led 10–0 at halftime. Nebraska, however, scored the game's final 18 points to win the game and end the season 6–2.

References

Nebraska
Nebraska Cornhuskers football seasons
Nebraska Cornhuskers football